Botshabelo ("place of refuge" in the Northern Sotho language) in the district of Middelburg, in Mpumalanga Province, South Africa, originated as a mission station established by Alexander Merensky of the Berlin Missionary Society (BMS), in February 1865 in what was then the Transvaal Republic (ZAR). Merensky had fled with a small number of parishioners following the attacks on his previous mission station, Ga-Ratau, by the soldiers of Sekhukhune, the king of the baPedi. Within a year of having established the mission station, the population had grown to 420 persons.

The BMS focused on providing schooling and bringing the gospel to people in their own language. Hence the Society’s missionaries were often at the forefront of publishing Bible translations, dictionaries and grammars in indigenous languages. It was as part of this process that Africans, duly trained and sometimes salaried, were accepted into the Society as teachers, catechists and lay-preachers, the so-called Nationalhelferen or national helpers.

One of these was one Jan Sekoto who was sent for further training in Germany. Returning earlier than anticipated, however, he took up a teaching post at Botshabelo. Sekoto’s son Gerard Sekoto, born at Botshabelo in 1913, would later emigrate to Europe, obtaining French citizenship and achieving considerable renown as an artist.

Besides the vestiges of the past, today Botshabelo is a living museum for the Ndebele architecture.

Notable people
Hans Merensky
Esther Mahlangu
Gerard Sekoto

References

External links

Mpumalanga tourism
Ndebele Village Museum on southafrica-travel.net

Populated places in the Steve Tshwete Local Municipality
Christian missions in South Africa